Allergic to Love is a 1944 American comedy musical romance film directed by Edward C. Lilley and starring Martha O'Driscoll, Noah Beery Jr. and David Bruce.

The film's plot centers on a bride (O'Driscoll) who appears to be allergic to her husband (Beery). Warren Wilson wrote the film's scenario and was associate producer.

Plot 
Arranged marriage.  Bride-to-be develops allergies to future husband.

Cast 
 Martha O'Driscoll as Pat Bradley
 Noah Beery Jr. as Kip Henderson
 David Bruce as J. Roger Mace
 Franklin Pangborn as Stewart Ives III
 Fuzzy Knight as Charlie
 Maxie Rosenbloom as Max
 Henry Armetta as Louie
 Marek Windheim as Dr. Kardos
 Paul Stanton as Mr. Bradley
 Olive Blakeney as Mrs. Bradley
 Grady Sutton as Cuthbert
 William B. Davidson as Mr. Henderson (as William Davidson)
 John Hamilton as Dr. McLaughlan
 George Chandler as Joe
 Olin Howland as Sam Walker (as Olin Howlin)
 Lotte Stein as Mrs. Beamish
 Edna Holland as Miss Peabody
 Dudley Dickerson as Whitey
 Chinita as Chinita
 The Guadalajara Trio as The Guadalajara Trio
 Lola Montes as Musical Specialty (as Antonio Triana and Montes)
 Antonio Triana as Musical Specialty (as Antonio Triana and Montes

See also 
List of American films of 1944

References

External links 

1944 films
American musical comedy films
1944 musical comedy films
American black-and-white films
Films directed by Edward C. Lilley
1940s American films